The Citadel Bulldogs rifle team represents The Citadel in rifle.  They compete in the National Collegiate Athletic Association and in the Southern Conference.  The Bulldogs have claimed two national and thirteen conference championships.  The team has produced 15 All-Americans.

The team competes at the Inouye Marksmanship Center, a highly advanced $3.2 million facility that is also utilized by The Citadel's club pistol team, ROTC, local law enforcement and the South Carolina National Guard

See also
List of NCAA rifle programs

References